KLEP (analog channel 17) was an independent non-commercial educational television station in Newark, Arkansas, United States. It broadcast local academic and public affairs programming beginning at 6 p.m. on weekdays from its 1985 sign-on until it quit broadcasting in the mid-2000s. It never returned; the corresponding broadcast license was eventually canceled on April 19, 2005.

LEP
Defunct television stations in the United States
Television channels and stations established in 1985
Television channels and stations disestablished in 2005
Educational and instructional television channels
1985 establishments in Arkansas
2005 disestablishments in Arkansas
LEP